National Central University (NCU, ; Pha̍k-fa-sṳ: Kwet-li̍p Chung-yong Thài-ho̍k, Wade–Giles: Kuo2 Li4 Chung Yang Ta4 Hsüeh2 or 中大, Chung-ta) is a public research university with long-standing traditions of the Republic of China based in Taiwan. It was founded in 1902 and renamed in 1915. The school was initially located in Miaoli when it first moved to Taiwan, but relocated to Zhongli in 1962 and developed into a comprehensive university. It's the first university in Taiwan to research industrial economics and economic development (Taiwan's Consumer Confidence Index is released monthly by NCU). NCU is a member of AACSB. NCU as one of the national six universities in research selected by the Ministry of Education.

NCU now has eight colleges in different areas, including College of Liberal Arts, College of Science, college of Engineering, College of Electrical Engineering and Computer Science, College of Biomedical Science and Engineering, college of Earth Sciences, College of Management, and College of Hakka Studies, also with areas in sociology, law and government studies, etc.

The undergraduate population is represented by the Associated Students of National Central University, founded in 1991.

History 
Established in 1902 as Sanjiang Normal School, National Central University underwent a number of name changes, such as Nanjing Higher Normal School, National Southeastern University and currently, National Central University. It was based in Nanking, but after the Chinese Communist Party took control of the mainland in 1949, the National Central University was re-established in Taiwan in 1962, as the National Central University Graduate Institute of Geophysics, in Miaoli County. The university's original site under communist control has since became part of the campus of Nanjing University. In 1968, NCU moved to its current location in the Shuanglianpo (雙連坡) district of Zhongli, Taoyuan County (now Zhongli District, Taoyuan City), Taiwan and was renamed the National Central University College of Science. In 1979, it was officially reestablished under the name National Central University. In 2003, NCU and three other national universities established the University System of Taiwan cooperative partnership. Now NCU is a research-oriented national comprehensive university.

Location 
The university's Taoyuan City campus is situated in the northern part of the island, about 45 minutes from the capital Taipei.  The large, green hilltop campus, is some distance away from the busy downtown Zhongli. NCU campus is only 30 minutes away from the Taiwan Taoyuan International Airport (TPE), which makes it very convenient for international travel.

NCU Lulin Observatory is located near Yushan National Park, in the southern part of Taiwan.

Colleges and Departments 

NCU consists of eight colleges: Earth Science, Electrical Engineering and Computer Science, Engineering, Hakka Studies, Health Science and Technology, Liberal Arts, Science, and Management. Each college houses numerous research centers, such as the Center for Space & Remote Sensing Research, Hazard Mitigation & Prevention, Taiwan Economic Development, Biotechnology & Biomedical Engineering, and several boutique-style humanities centers. In total, the eight colleges contain 19 undergraduate departments, 48 graduate institutes, and 38 research centers.

International programs
NCU participates in the Taiwan International Graduate Program in Earth System Science of Academia Sinica, Taiwan's most preeminent academic research institution.

Notable Alumni and Faculty
 Chien-Shiung Wu, famous particle and experimental physicist
 Hwawei Ko, pedagogue and professor
 Hu Shih, professor, political theorist, and diplomat in the Republic of China

See also
 List of universities in Taiwan

Notes

References

External links 

National Central University 

 
Educational institutions established in 1962
1962 establishments in Taiwan
Universities and colleges in Taiwan
Comprehensive universities in Taiwan